Gombe is a traditional dish from Sogn og Fjordane in Norway.  It is made from curdled unpasteurized milk which is boiled down with sugar for several hours.  It is generally served with lefse.

Fermented dairy products
Norwegian cuisine